Colin Beck is a Solomon Islands diplomat. He is the Solomons' current permanent representative to the United Nations and current ambassador to the United States. He also served a one-year term from 2008 to 2009 as vice-president-elect of the 63rd Session of the United Nations General Assembly.

As his country's representative in the United Nations, he spearheaded the motion which led to the United Nations General Assembly re-inscribing French Polynesia on the United Nations list of non-self-governing territories in May 2013.

References

Solomon Islands diplomats
Ambassadors of the Solomon Islands to the United States
Permanent Representatives of the Solomon Islands to the United Nations
Living people
1964 births